The 1995 Topper Open was a men's tennis tournament held in Montevideo, Uruguay and played on outdoor clay courts. The tournament was part of the World Series circuit of the 1995 ATP Tour. It was the second edition of the tournament and was held from 30 October through 5 November 1995. Eighth-seeded Bohdan Ulihrach won the singles title.

Finals

Singles
 Bohdan Ulihrach defeated  Alberto Berasategui 6–2, 6–3
 It was Ulihrach's 2nd singles title of the year and of his career.

Doubles
 Sergio Casal /  Emilio Sánchez defeated  Jiří Novák /  David Rikl, 2–6, 7–6, 7–6

References

External links
 ITF tournament edition details

Topper Open
Topper Open